Sunrise is a dramatic film written and directed by Partho Sen-Gupta, released in 2014. Set in Mumbai, it tells the story of a grieving father searching for his daughter Aruna, kidnapped years ago. The main role is played by Adil Hussain accompanied by Tannishtha Chatterjee, Komal Gupta, Esha Amlani and veteran actress Ashalata Wabgaonkar.

Sunrise, an Indo-French co-production, was screened at numerous international festivals and received several international awards ( Amsterdam, Durban, Munich ).

Plot
Inspector Joshi is a grieving father searching for his daughter Aruna, kidnapped years ago at the age of six. In his despair, life converges with a recurring dream in which Joshi pursues a shadowy figure who leads him to 'Paradise', a night-club where teenage girls dance to a leering crowd. He is convinced he will find Aruna there and vows to bring her back to Leela, his broken wife.

Cast
Adil Hussain
Tannishtha Chatterjee
Gulnaaz Ansari
Komal Gupta
Esha Amlani
Ashalata Wabgaonkar
Bachan Pachehra
Hridaynath Jadhav
Chinmay Kambli

Award and Selections
During the years 2014 and 2015, Sunrise was screened at numerous international festivals and competed at awards ceremonies.

Awards
Durban International Film Festival (2015) – Best Film: Partho Sen-Gupta and Best cinematography: Jean-Marc Ferrière; 
Imagine Film Festival (2015) – Black Tulip Award: Partho Sen-Gupta 
Filmfest Munchen (2015) (Munich Film Festival) – One Future Prize: Partho Sen-Gupta

Selections
Busan International Film Festival (2014) – World Premiere – Nominated New Currents Award: Partho Sen-Gupta
Dharamshala International Film Festival (2014) 
Asia Pacific Screen Awards (2015) – Nomination for Achievement in Cinematography: Jean-Marc Ferrière
Beaune International Thriller Film Festival (2015) – Nomination Prix Sang Neuf: Partho Sen-Gupta 
Tribeca Film Festival (2015) – North American Premiere
Fantasia International Film Festival (2015) – Canadian Premiere
BFI London Film Festival (2015) – UK Premiere
International Film Festival and Forum on Human Rights (2015) – Swiss Premiere - Fiction and Human Rights Competition - Nominated for the Grand Prize Fiction and Human Rights 
Sitges Film Festival (2015) – Spanish Premiere - Noves Visions Plus Section - Nominated for the Noves Visions Plus Award 
Fantasia Film Festival (2015) – Canadian Premiere 
Vilnius International Film Festival (2015) – Lithuanian Premiere 
Flanders International Film Festival Ghent (2015) – Belgian Premiere - Official Selection: Global Cinemas 
Melbourne International Film Festival (2015) Accent on Asia section 
Sydney Film Festival (2015) Official Selection 
Roffa Mon Amour (2015) Rotterdam Premiere 
Etrange Film Festival (2015) French Premiere

Release
Sunrise was released in limited arthouses cinemas in Germany (20 August 2015) by Rapid Eye Movies, in France by Eurozoom (2 March 2016) and in the U.S (24 July 2016) by Breaking Glass Pictures. It was then released on SVOD on Netflix worldwide (except France, due in March 2019). It is also available on Kanopy. In August 2018, it was released on the German Indie Film VOD platform Realeyz and is available in Germany, Austria and Portugal.

References

External links
 
 

Films set in India
2014 films
2010s Marathi-language films